Albert J. "Bo" Otto (June 5, 1902 – October 7, 1983) was an American football center for the Louisville Brecks of the National Football League (NFL) from 1922 to 1923. He played also guard and tackle.

References

1902 births
1983 deaths
Players of American football from Louisville, Kentucky
American football offensive linemen
Louisville Brecks players